Choi Kwang Do is a martial art developed by Choi Kwang-jo. The style relies more on flexibility and fluidity of movement as opposed to the more rigid lines of some other martial arts. To achieve this it employs yoga-based stretching to develop the flexibility of practitioners.

History
Choi Kwang Do was founded by Choi Kwang-jo on March 2, 1987. Choi Kwang-jo was born in South Korea before emigrating to United States in the early 1970s. Choi was a successful ITF Tae Kwon Do practitioner and trainer (serving as a chief instructor) before establishing his own style.

While teaching and demonstrating ITF Tae Kwon Do in South East Asia, Choi Kwang-jo became injured through his training and demonstrations to the point where he was unable to continue with the discipline. So he left Malaysia (where he was demonstrating at the time) for North America, in the hope of finding orthopedic surgeons who would be able to help with his injuries. Determining that the injuries were caused by the way he was performing martial arts, Choi undertook rehabilitative exercises, attended various seminars and studied techniques for rehabilitation. Choi incorporated these techniques into his own fighting style, and from that he developed Choi Kwang Do.

Today, Choi Kwang-Do is headquartered in Atlanta, Georgia by one organization and Temperance, Michigan by another organization. It is taught in numerous countries including the United Kingdom with schools in England, Scotland and Wales, Puerto Rico with schools in Guaynabo, Las Piedras, Caguas and San Lorenzo.

Style and training

Choi Kwang Do emphasizes the use of biomechanics, and to employ a number of modern disciplines, such as kinesiology and psychology, in its design. The result is a tendency towards the use of natural bilateral movement and fluid sequential motion to develop optimum force on impact to place less pressure on the joints. The style also incorporates breathing and stretching exercises from yoga.

Choi Kwang Do is not designed for competition, but for a natural and effective response to everyday stimuli and training is a mix of contact drills using pads and shields, non-contact drills and "in-fighting" close-quarter drills.

Practitioners
Notable practitioners of the Choi Kwang Do style include:
 Choi Kwang-jo (founder) – inducted into the Taekwondo Times Magazine Hall of Fame, 2006.
 Lynne Russell – Deputy Sheriff, Private Investigator and author of How to Win Friends, Kick Ass and Influence People.
Catriona Gray – Miss Universe 2018, and Filipino television host, singer, model, and stage actress.

Promise
To always do my best and never give up
To obey my parents and teachers
To always be polite
To tell the truth and honour my word
To never misuse what I learn in class

Pledge
To set positive goals and strive to achieve them
To apply self discipline to further my personal development 
To stand for justice and honour my word
To promote friendly relationships among all people
To use what I learn in class in a constructive manner

Principles

Humility
Integrity
Gentleness
Perseverance
Self-Control
Unbreakable Spirit

Commands

Grading Information

References

External links 
 Choi Kwang-Do International Organisation
 Reflect-CKD About Choi Kwang Do

South Korean martial arts
www.adaptckd.com